Huzurnagar is the third largest town in the Suryapet district of the Indian state of Telangana. Huzurnagar is a Municipality and the Mandal Headquarters of Huzurnagar Mandal. It is  far away from the district Headquarters Suryapet.

References

3  https://m.timesofindia.com/city/hyderabad/21-nagar-panchayats-now-elevated-as-municipalities/articleshow/63451608.cms

Cities and towns in Suryapet district
Mandal headquarters in Suryapet district